Deuce Bigalow: Male Gigolo is a 1999 American sex comedy film directed by Mike Mitchell in his feature-length directorial debut, written by Harris Goldberg and Rob Schneider, and starring Schneider in the title role, William Forsythe, Eddie Griffin, and Arija Bareikis. The film tells the story of a hapless fishtank cleaner who goes into business as a male sex worker in an attempt to earn enough money to repair damage he caused while house-sitting. The film is notable for being the first film produced by Happy Madison Productions.

The film was released on December 10, 1999 by Buena Vista Pictures (through its Touchstone Pictures label). While the film received negative reviews from critics, it was a box office success, grossing $92 million worldwide on a $17 million budget.

A sequel, titled Deuce Bigalow: European Gigolo, was released in 2005 by Columbia Pictures instead of Touchstone Pictures.

Plot
Deuce Bigalow, an insecure fishtank cleaner, is fired for cleaning the tank at a public aquarium while naked. Deuce is unsuccessful in attracting women, so he attempts to keep himself busy at work. On a house call, he meets the Argentinian male prostitute Antoine Laconte. Antoine is going on a business trip, and so asks Deuce to care for his sick lionfish and protect his home while he is away. Deuce accidentally sets Antoine's kitchen on fire when trying to make a grilled cheese sandwich in the toaster, and breaks an expensive fish tank, causing a lot of water damage.

Fearing Antoine will kill him (Antoine even tells him he will if he messes the place up), Deuce is forced to find a way to pay $6,000 for the damage. Low-rent pimp T.J. Hicks offers to help Deuce make enough money to buy a new fish tank, and convinces Deuce to take over the absent Antoine's role as a gigolo. Deuce decides to make the clients feel better about themselves since he only desires to have sex with beautiful women.

Deuce meets unusual clients but he still manages to get along with them, despite there being no sex involved, by helping them with certain issues in their lives. The clients include Carol, a woman who is severely narcoleptic; Ruth, who has Tourette syndrome with coprolalia, and therefore is afraid of socializing; Fluisa, a mannish obese woman weighing close to 750 pounds; and Tina, a woman that has a pituitary gland disorder and is extremely tall. Deuce's list of clients gradually increases, with each client being satisfied by much more fulfilling measures due to his personal attention and friendship. However, Deuce falls in love with one of his clients, Kate, who has a prosthetic leg. She later breaks up with Deuce when she finds out that he was a prostitute hired by her friends.

Meanwhile, Deuce is being stalked by Detective Chuck Fowler, who demands Antoine's "black book" of clients and threatens to take Deuce to jail if he does not comply. Deuce eventually helps Fowler please his wife by stripping and erotically dancing for her, and the two make amends. Deuce is still taken into custody on prostitution charges, as Fowler needs someone to bring in and Deuce refuses to betray his friend T.J. At the hearing, it is revealed that Deuce never slept with any of the clients except for Kate. Since Deuce gave back the money to Kate and was not paid for sex with her, he is cleared of all charges.

Using the money he made, Deuce restores Antoine's fish tank, although due to time constraints, he is warned that the glass may not be installed properly. Unfortunately, Kate's blind roommate accidentally kills the prize fish in Antoine's aquarium when she starts the mixer in which the fish was being kept. Deuce buys a replacement fish and returns to Antoine's house just before he returns. Antoine taps the new aquarium and the glass shatters. Deuce then reveals his prostituting adventures to the furious Antoine. Enraged, Antoine tries to kill Deuce and at one point shoots a crossbow bolt at him. Fluisa shows up, comes between the two men, and saves Deuce's life (she is not killed because the bolt hits her breasts, between which she has hidden a roast chicken). Antoine is then arrested by Detective Fowler and Deuce marries Kate.

The end sequences then follow. Deuce's father becomes a male prostitute. Fluisa underwent extensive liposuction and became a model in Victoria's Secret known as Naomi. Ruth opens up an all-girls school for people with Tourette's. Carol manages to fulfill her dream trip to France and dies falling off the Eiffel Tower. T.J. starts his own reality show dedicated to his experiences as a male prostitute. An incarcerated Antoine marries Tina.

Cast

 Rob Schneider as Deuce Bigalow, an insecure fishtank cleaner turned gigolo.
 William Forsythe as Detective Charles "Chuck" Fowler, an LAPD detective and Antoine's nemesis.
 Eddie Griffin as Tiberius Jefferson "T.J." Hicks, a crazy low-rent pimp and Deuce's friend.
 Arija Bareikis as Kate, a woman with prosthetic leg, one of the Deuce's clients and later his wife.
 Oded Fehr as Antoine Laconte, a famous gigolo from Argentina and Chuck's nemesis.
 Gail O'Grady as Claire
 Richard Riehle as Robert "Bob" Bigalow, Deuce's dad.
 Jacqueline Obradors as Elaine Fowler, Chuck's wife.
 Big Boy as Fluisa aka Jabba, an obese woman weighing close to 750 pounds and one of the Deuce's clients.
 Amy Poehler as Ruth, a woman who has Tourette syndrome with coprolalia and is one of Deuce's clients.
 Dina Platias as Bergita
 Deborah Lemen as Carol, a woman with narcolepsy who is one of Deuce's clients and is seeking to go on a trip to France.
 Torsten Voges as Tina, a woman that has a pituitary gland disorder and is extremely tall. She is also one of the Deuce's clients.
 Bree Turner as Allison
 Andrew Shaifer as Neil
 Allen Covert as Vic
 Elle King as Cookie Girl
 Jackie Sandler as Sally
 Pilar Schneider as Old Lady at Restaurant
 Norm Macdonald as Bartender (uncredited)
 Adam Sandler as the voice of Robert Justin (uncredited), an offscreen passerby.
 Marlo Thomas as Margaret (uncredited)
 Barry Cutler as Dr. Rosenblatt
 John Harrington Bland as Dr. Rosenblatt's Patient
 Ron Soble as Judge Addison
 Robb Skyler as District Attorney

Production

Deuce Bigalow: Male Gigolo was the first film released by the Happy Madison Productions film production company. Adam Sandler served as the film's executive producer. Sandler also starred behind the scenes and can be heard yelling the infamous "Freak!' line and other various lines in the background.

Soundtrack

 "Call Me" - Blondie
 "Spill the Wine" - Eric Burdon and War
 "You Sexy Thing" - Hot Chocolate
 "Get Down Tonight" - KC and the Sunshine Band
 "Let's Get It On" - Marvin Gaye
 "I'm Not in Love" - 10cc
 "Magnet and Steel" - Walter Egan
 "No Worries" - Hepcat
 "Can't Smile Without You" - Sean Beal
 "Lift Me Up" - Jeff Lynne
 "Call Me" - Emilia Maiello

Release

Box office
Deuce Bigalow: Male Gigolo opened theatrically on December 10, 1999 in 2,154 venues and earned $12,224,016 in its opening weekend, ranking third in the North American box office behind Toy Story 2 fourth weekend and fellow newcomer The Green Mile. The film ended its run, having grossed $65,538,755 in the United States and Canada, and $27,400,000 overseas for a worldwide total of $92,938,755. Based on a $17 million budget, the film was a box office success.

Critical reception
Deuce Bigalow: Male Gigolo received negative reviews from critics. On Rotten Tomatoes, it has an approval rating of 22% based on 76 reviews, with an average rating of 4.01/10. The site's consensus states: "According to critics, Deuce Bigalow is just too dumb and filled with old, tired gags." On Metacritic it has a score of 30 out of 100 based on reviews from 26 critics, indicating "generally unfavorable reviews". Audiences surveyed by CinemaScore gave the film a grade B.

Roger Ebert of the Chicago Sun-Times gave the film one-and-a-half out of four stars, stating "It's the kind of picture those View n' Brew theaters were made for, as long as you don't View." Kendall Morgan from The Dallas Morning News writes in her review, "Deuce Bigalow: Male Gigolo makes There's Something About Mary look like Masterpiece Theatre."

Sequel

In 2005, a sequel, Deuce Bigalow: European Gigolo, was released by Columbia Pictures instead of Touchstone Pictures.

References

External links

 
 
 
 
 
 
 

1999 films
1990s English-language films
1999 romantic comedy films
1990s sex comedy films
American romantic comedy films
American sex comedy films
Films about male prostitution in the United States
Films scored by Teddy Castellucci
Films shot in California
Films shot in Florida
Films directed by Mike Mitchell
Films shot in Los Angeles
Happy Madison Productions films
Films with screenplays by Rob Schneider
Touchstone Pictures films
1999 directorial debut films
1990s American films